The Richmond Railroad Station Historic District is a group of historic commercial buildings and national historic district located at Richmond, Wayne County, Indiana.

Historic District
The district encompasses 22 contributing buildings the icon of which is the Daniel Burnham-designed Pennsylvania Railroad Station, completed in 1902.  It developed between about 1853 and 1915 and includes representative examples of Italianate, Classical Revival, and Chicago School style architecture.  In addition to the Pennsylvania Railroad Station, other notable buildings include the Miller Brothers Block (1890), Jacob H. Lichtenfels Building (1890), Charles Sudhoff Building (1893), Benjamin Starr Building (1896), William H. Alford Building (1905), John Roberts Building (1877), R.F.D. Hose House No. 1 (1890), James Shaw Building (1875), and Richmond / Atlas Underwear Building (1910).

The district was added to the National Register of Historic Places in 1987 and is also a local conservation district designated by the City of Richmond's Historic Preservation Commission.

Railroad station
It hosted trains on north–south and east–west trajectories through eastern Indiana:
Amtrak:
National Limited - Kansas City - New York, New York
Pennsylvania Railroad:
American - St. Louis - New York, New York
Buckeye - Chicago - Cincinnati, Ohio
Indianapolis Limited - Indianapolis - New York, New York
Northern Arrow - Mackinaw City - Cincinnati, Ohio, with sleeping car sections moved onto connecting trains to St. Louis
Penn Texas - St. Louis - New York, New York
Southland - Chicago - St. Petersburg, Florida/Sarasota, Florida/Miami, Florida
Spirit of St. Louis - St. Louis - New York, New York
St. Louisan - St. Louis - New York, New York
Union - Chicago - Cincinnati, Ohio, and a section to Columbus via Dayton

A previous station at this same location was also a stop on the procession of Abraham Lincoln's funeral train. Indiana Governor, Oliver P. Morton, boarded the train at this stop, and rode it to Indianapolis, where a procession and showing were held.

See also 
 Old Richmond Historic District
 Starr Historic District
 Reeveston Place Historic District
 East Main Street-Glen Miller Park Historic District
 Richmond Downtown Historic District

References

External links

 Railroad Station Historic District photos and information from Waynet.org
 Pennsylvania Railroad, August 6, 1950 timetable

Historic districts on the National Register of Historic Places in Indiana
Italianate architecture in Indiana
Neoclassical architecture in Indiana
Geography of Wayne County, Indiana
Railway stations on the National Register of Historic Places in Indiana
Historic districts in Richmond, Indiana
National Register of Historic Places in Wayne County, Indiana
Former Pennsylvania Railroad stations
Former Amtrak stations in Indiana
Transportation buildings and structures in Wayne County, Indiana
Chicago school architecture in Indiana
Railway stations in the United States opened in 1902
Railway stations closed in 1979